Mazdak Mirzaei (Persian: مزدک میرزایی; born 17 September 1970) is an Iranian football commentator, producer, television presenter, writer, director and translator.  Mirzaei is the presenter and producer of the Hattrick program aired by Iran International. In 2005, he was awarded the prize of the best sports commentator of IRIB. Mazdak Mirzaei worked in IRIB from 1997 to 2019.

Education 
he is a PhD in International law from the Islamic Azad University, Science and Research Branch, Tehran.

Commentary 
The match between the Nantes and Monaco teams was the first football match in which he managed to commentary parts of it for ten minutes alongside Javad Khiabani, after which he joined the football team of IRIB TV3. According to Mazdak, the match between the national teams of Iran and South Korea in the 2014 FIFA World Cup qualification, which was scored by Reza Ghoochannejhad, led to his most memorable commentary.

Commentary in Iran International 
Mazdak Mirzaei made his first commentary in Iran International on 29 January 2020 for the match of R. Charleroi S.C. and Club Brugge KV in the fifth week of the Belgian First Division A. This was Mirzaei's first commentary after about 7 months away from football commentary.

Leaving Iran 
He left Iran in the 2019 summer and joined the Iran International satellite network. Initially, it was said that Mazdak Mirzaei had also taken a large part of the IRIB Archive with him and was planning to use it. But Seyyed Morteza Mirbagheri, Deputy of Broadcasting of the Islamic Republic of Iran, denied it. Some say the closure of the network's work space after Ali Foroughi's presidency began as a reason for his departure from Iran.

Hattrick program 
Mazdak Mirzaei first appeared on Iran International Satellite TV's front-facing camera on Wednesday, 4 December 2019, explaining the reasons for leaving Iran and joining the satellite network as a guest of ChandChand sport program. He performed the first episode of the Hattrick program live on Saturday, 7 December 2019.

Effects

TV programs

Bibliography 
 Derby Story (Dastan-e Shahravard). Tehran: Nashr-e Varzesh, 2014.

Awards 
The best sports commentator of IRIB – 2005

See also 
 Adel Ferdosipour
 Javad Khiabani
 Hattrick

References

External links 

 

1970 births
Living people
People from Tehran
Iranian television personalities
People from Tehran Province
Iranian radio and television presenters